is a Japanese illustrator known, along for his design work on the original Sony AIBO, for his precisely detailed, erotic portrayals of feminine robots. He describes his highly detailed style as "superrealism", which he says "deals with the technical issue of how close one can get to one's object."

Modern English-language editions of Sorayama's art books give his name as Hajime Sorayama, using conventional Western order, with given name followed by surname. Some older publications give his name as Sorayama Hajime, using native Japanese name order, which puts the family name first.

Early life
Hajime Sorayama was born in 1947 in Imabari, Ehime prefecture, Japan. He received his basic education at Imabari Kita High School where he began drawing Playboy inspired pin-ups. He was influenced by Makoto Oda's book Nandemo Mite yaro ("I'll go and see everything") about his travels through Europe and Asia; Sorayama took interest in Greece and decided to enter Christian Shikoku Gakuin University to study English literature and Ancient Greek. In his second year, he founded the school magazine, Pink Journal, but was heavily criticized by teachers and students alike so left for Tokyo's Chuo Art School in 1967 to study art.

Sorayama graduated in 1968 at the age of 21, and gained an appointment in an advertising agency. He became a freelance illustrator in 1972. In 1978, he drew his first robot. Of this subject, he wrote: "A friend of mine, the designer Hara Koichi, wanted to use C-3PO from Star Wars for a Suntory poster presentation. But time was short and there were problems with copyright fee[s], so I was asked to come up with something."

Career
Sorayama is known for his fine art, illustration, and industrial design.  Of the distinction between the first two, Soryama commented in an interview: "Unlike art, illustration is not a matter of emotion or hatreds, but an experience that comes naturally through logical thinking."

Sorayama's first art book Sexy Robot, was published by Genko-sha in 1983.  For the work, he used ideas from pin-up art, which in the book then appear as chrome-plated gynoids in suggestive poses. His next book, Pin-up (Graphic-sha, 1984), continued in the same vein. A number of his other works similarly revolve around figures in suggestive poses, including highly realistic depictions in latex and leather. His pin-up work appeared monthly for years in the pages of Penthouse magazine, and Playboy TV later aired made a television special on Soryama's art.  Sorayama said of his pin-up work: "That’s my mania. I’ve been drawing them since high school. Back then, there was this thing for the Playboy and Penthouse playmates. Now, it’s the girl-next-door, idol type, but in our day, these pin-ups were like goddesses. I guess I could describe it as my own goddess cult."
In 1985 Sorayama published the video Illustration Video, his first work apart from the books of illustrations. This features work he did for the films Brain Dead (1992), Timecop (1994), and Space Trucker (1995); design of trading cards, limited-edition prints, CD-ROMs, and the cover art for Aerosmith's 2001 album Just Push Play; art exhibitions; and the initial design for what would eventually become Sony's dog-like robotic "pet", the AIBO. He published an additional four books in the 1980s, and three new volumes plus a retrospective collection in the 1990s. Production models of Sony AIBO went to market on May 11, 1999.

In the 2000s, Sorayama's first-generation AIBO design (the robotics of which were developed by Sony's Toshitada Doi) received the Grand Prize of Best Design award, the highest design award conferred by Japan. AIBO has since been included in the permanent collections of the Museum of Modern Art (MOMA) and the Smithsonian Institution. MOMA published a book, Objects of Design by Paola Antonelli, which included AIBO along with other noteworthy designs where form and function combine in harmony. AIBO was the first "artificially intelligent" mass-market consumer robot for 
entertainment applications. It has been the subject of special studies at Carnegie Mellon University and other academic institutions. Also in this decade, Sorayama produced nine more books and the Nike "White Dunk Project" included Sorayama's art among the 25 most inspiring Japanese artists.

The artist released another retrospective, Master Works, in early 2010, and a new book, Vibrant Vixens, in May 2013 and updated version "XL Masterworks" in 2014. He worked with filmmakers in Hollywood on fantasy and science fiction projects, including a film about Penthouse. During 2012 and 2013, Sorayama worked on project(s) with American fashion designer Marc Ecko. In 2013 and 2014, Sorayama was engaged by Star Wars filmmaker George Lucas to create a spread of Twi'lek and droid fantasy Star Wars pin-ups for a tribute art book entitled Star Wars Art Concept, near the time Lucas's company LucasFilm was sold to Disney.

In 2021, it was announced by the official merchandising account for The Weeknd on Instagram that he and Hajime Sorayama were partnering to produce merchandise to celebrate the 10th anniversary of The Weeknd's mixtape, Echoes of Silence.

Bibliography
 Pink Journal (1967)
 Sexy Robot (1983, Genko-sha)
 Pin-up (1984, Graphic-sha)
 Venus Odyssey (1985, Ed. Tokuma communications)
 Hajime Sorayama (1989, Taco, Berlín)
 Sorayama Hyper Illustrations (1 & 2) (1989, Bijutsu Shuppan-sha)
 The Gynoids (1993, Edition Treville)
 Naga (1997, Sakuhin-sha)
 Torquere (1998, Sakuhin-sha)
 Sorayama 1964-99. The Complete Works (1999, Sakuhin-sha)
 The Gynoids genetically manipulated (2000, Edition Treville)
 Gynoids reborn (2000, Edition Treville)
 Sorayamart (2000, Ed. Soleil)
 Moira (2000, Edition Kunst der Comics)
 Metallicon (2001, Sakuhin-sha)
 The Gynoids. The Storage Box (2002, Edition Treville)
 Venom (2002, Graphic-sha)
 Latex Galatea (2003, Editions Treville)
 Relativision (2006)
  "Sorayama's Master Works", (late spring 2010 release) 
  "Vibrant Vixens", (late spring 2013 release) 
  "XL Masterworks", (2014 release)

References

External links
 

Japanese contemporary artists
Japanese illustrators
Japanese graphic designers
Japanese industrial designers
Japanese painters
Fetish artists
Pin-up artists
Fantasy artists
Science fiction artists
Artist authors
Japanese erotic artists
1947 births
Living people
People from Imabari, Ehime
Artist from Ehime Prefecture